Leichhardt was an electoral district of the Legislative Assembly in the Australian state of Queensland from 1860 to 1932.

Taking in areas of central Queensland west of the Great Dividing Range, the district in its original form stretched as far as Mackay in the north and as far south as Taroom. Originally a dual member constituency, it was one of the sixteen districts contested at the first colonial election in 1860. It became a single member constituency in 1873 but reverted to being a dual member electorate in 1878. A single member constituency again in 1888, it remained that way thereafter. One of the district's first members was Robert Herbert, the first Premier of Queensland.

By the time of its abolition—at the 1932 state election—the district was based on Clermont and Springsure. Its territory was split between the pre-existing districts of Barcoo and Normanby.

Members for Leichhardt

See also
 Electoral districts of Queensland
 Members of the Queensland Legislative Assembly by year
 :Category:Members of the Queensland Legislative Assembly by name

References

Former electoral districts of Queensland
Constituencies established in 1860
1860 establishments in Australia
Constituencies disestablished in 1932
1932 disestablishments in Australia